Peter Marx is an American lawyer and business executive. He is known for coining the term "Information law". Marx is currently the President of the Wellesley Public Media Corporation Board of Directors. He is also the former host of the public television show Business Insight.

Education
Peter Marx received a BA, MBA, and JD from Cornell University.

Career
Between 1968 and 1971 Peter Marx was a staff attorney with the U.S. Securities and Exchange Commission. In the early 1980s, Marx served as the vice president and general counsel of Chase Econometrics/Interactive Data Corporation. During this time, Marx chaired several legal technology forums that focused on the future of law in technology and intellectual property, including the New England Computer Law Forum.

He was then a partner at the Goulston & Storrs law firm in Boston where he became an expert in the developing application of the law to computer technology companies. During the 1980s, Marx advocated for companies and clients to better understand their rights in order to pursue potential market opportunities as the laws evolved around the industry; and for government to adapt. He then became general counsel to the five-hundred member firm group the Information Industry Association, and served as chairman of the New England Corporate Counsel Association (an industry group for northeastern in-house counsel that he cofounded). Beginning in 1987, Marx was the chairman of The Marx Group, a law and consulting firm, which provided part-time counsel and legal help for technology companies unable to retain full-time in-house legal help.

Media
In the mid-2000s, Marx produced podcasts and videos for major law firms targeted at law students and associates. Marx also hosted the television series Business Insight on public access television, in which he interviewed entrepreneurs and other business individuals. He is the President of the Wellesley Public Media Corporation Board of Directors, as well as the current director of the Cornell Law School’s Alumni Helping Alumni careers program.

Books
Marx is the author of Information Law: A Compilation of Articles, in which he first coined the term “Information Law” in 1985. He later wrote the Contracts in the Information Industry series of books, published by the Information Industry Association.

References

Living people
Lawyers from Boston
Cornell Law School alumni
Cornell University alumni
American television hosts
American business executives
Computer law scholars
Year of birth missing (living people)